Vijaygarh Jyotish Roy College is a college in Kolkata, India. It offers science, arts, and commerce courses with undergraduate and post-graduate degrees, and it is affiliated with the University of Calcutta. It is recognized under University Grants Commission (UGC), and accredited by the National Assessment and Accreditation Council of India (NAAC).

Foundation
The land was originally owned by the United States Army and by a private zamindar. In June 1950 the first colony committee consisting of Santosh Kumar Dutta, Bhupendra Lal Nag, Prof. Samar Chowdhury and Prof. Sukumar Chakraborty set its sight upon the military barrack as the possible site for the college. 
The college was finally founded in 1950, 2 November. The first Governing Body with Prof. Prasanta Kumar Bose at the helm included such illustrious academicians as Dr. Triguna Sen, Dhirendranath Raychowdhury, Nagendranath Pal, Sukumar Gupta, Dr. Makhanlal Raychowdhury.

Departments

Arts
English
History
Journalism and Mass Communication
Bengali
Education
Political Science
Philosophy

Science
Botany
Microbiology
Physics
Chemistry
Mathematics
Physiology
Zoology
Environmental Science
Computer applications

Commerce
Commerce
Accounting and Finances
Economics

Certificate courses

Filmmaking and Television Production
Web Journalism, Animation and Graphics Design
Newspaper Reporting and Editing
Employability skill 
Public Relations
Radio Production
News Reading And Anchoring

Master's degree 

Microbiology

Notable alumni
Triguna Sen, Union Minister for education in Government of India. He got Padma Bhushan.
Chinmoy Guha, Bengali essayist and translator, awarded three knighthoods by the Ministry of Education, and one by the Ministry of Culture.

Accreditation
Vijaygarh Jyotish Ray College is recognized by the University Grants Commission and accredited by the National Assessment and Accreditation Council of India.The College has a good academic record and meritorious students are recognized as an asset of the college. Regular and meritorious students of the college are awarded scholarships for further studies. The students of the college have a reputation of achieving several titles and medals in sports at the State and District level

See also 
List of colleges affiliated to the University of Calcutta
Education in India
Education in West Bengal

References

External links

University of Calcutta affiliates
Educational institutions established in 1950
1950 establishments in West Bengal